Wehani rice, also known as California Red Jasmine Rice, is a variety of aromatic brown rice developed in the late 20th century by Lundberg Family Farms of Richvale, California. It is a registered trademark of Lundberg Family Farms, the only company that grows it. The name of the rice originates from the brothers of the family, Wendell, Eldon, Homer, Albert, and Harlan Lundberg.

Wehani rice was developed from basmati rice seeds, which originate from India. The grains of Wehani rice are reddish-brown in color and resemble wild rice. When cooked, the rice produces an aroma similar to that of hot buttered popcorn or peanuts and is slightly chewy in texture. 

Being developed from basmati rice, this variety of rice can be classified as Oryza sativa, or Asian rice. It can be placed more specifically in the indica subspecies.

See also
 List of rice varieties
 Ambemohar
 Basmati rice
 Jasmine rice
 Oryza sativa

References 

Rice varieties
Agriculture in California